Paul Goldstein (born January 14, 1943) is a law professor at Stanford Law School.

A globally recognized expert on intellectual property law, Goldstein is the author of an influential four-volume treatise on U.S. copyright law and a five-volume treatise on international copyright law, as well as leading casebooks on intellectual property and international intellectual property. He has authored nine books including five novels, Errors and Omissions, A Patent Lie, Secret Justice, Legal Asylum and Havana Requiem, which won the 2013 Harper Lee Prize for Legal Fiction. Some of his other works include Copyright’s Highway: From Gutenberg to the Celestial Jukebox, a widely acclaimed book on the history and future of copyright, and Intellectual Property: The Tough New Realities That Could Make or Break Your Business.

Goldstein has been regularly included in Best Lawyers in America. He has served as chairman of the United States Office of Technology Assessment Advisory Panel on Intellectual Property Rights in an Age of Electronics and Information, has been a visiting scholar at the Max Planck Institute for Foreign and International Patent, Copyright, and Competition Law, and was a founding faculty member of the Munich Intellectual Property Law Center. In addition, before joining the Stanford Law School faculty in 1975, he was a professor of law at the University at Buffalo Law School.

Recent publications
Paul Goldstein, Goldstein On Copyright, 3rd ed., New York: Aspen, 2013.
Paul Goldstein and P. Bernt Hugenholtz, International Copyright: Principles, Law and Practice 4th ed., New York: Oxford University Press, 2019.
Paul Goldstein and Marketa Trimble, International Intellectual Property Law: Cases and Materials, 3rd edition, New York: Foundation Press, 2012.
Paul Goldstein and R. Anthony Reese, Copyright, Patent, Trademark and Related State Doctrines: Cases and Materials on Intellectual Property Law, 7th edition, New York, NY: Foundation Press, 2012.
Paul Goldstein, Copyright's Highway: From Gutenberg to the Celestial Jukebox, Rev. ed., Stanford, CA: Stanford University Press, 2003.

References

External links
 official website

1943 births
Brandeis University alumni
Columbia Law School alumni
LaRouche movement
Living people
People from Mount Vernon, New York
Stanford Law School faculty